Pietro Facchetti (1539 – 27 February 1613) was an Italian painter of the late Renaissance, mainly active in Rome.

Born to a poor family in Mantua. Facchetti initially trained with Lorenzo Costa the younger, but then moved to Rome and joined the studio of Scipione da Gaeta, where he gained fame as a portrait painter.

References

1539 births
1613 deaths
16th-century Italian painters
Italian male painters
17th-century Italian painters
Italian Renaissance painters